Beigong Town, formerly Changxindian Town, is a town within the Fengtai District of Beijing, China. It borders Yongding Township and Gucheng Subdistrict to the north, Lugu and Wanping Subdistricts to the east, Changyang Town to the south, Yungang Subdistrict and Wangzuo Town to the west, and contains Changxindian Subdistrict within it. Its population was 44,358 as of the year 2020.

The Town was named Beigong after the Beigong National Forest Park within the region.

History

Administrative Division 
As of 2021, Beigong Town is divided into 16 subdivisions, with 10 communities and 6 villages:

See also 

 List of township-level divisions of Beijing

References 

Fengtai District
Towns in Beijing